Lepidaploa is a genus of flowering plants in the sunflower family, native to tropical parts of the Western Hemisphere.

It is a relatively large genus, formerly subsumed in the genus Vernonia.

 Species

References

 
Asteraceae genera
Taxonomy articles created by Polbot